The SAFILM – San Antonio Film Festival was founded in 1994 by Adam Rocha as a video festival, which sported a logo of a naughty-looking angel. It was later renamed the San Antonio Underground Film Festival and then finally the SAFILM – San Antonio Film Festival. It is now the biggest film festival in South Texas.

The non-profit festival is held each summer at the Tobin Center for the Performing Arts. Its mission is to serve as an accessible and inclusive platform for artists in the category of cinema and provide cinematic culture to a diverse audience.

The 22nd annual SAFILM – San Antonio Film Festival was held July 25–31, 2016. 145 films were screened, including a local premiere of Hell or High Water, starring Jeff Bridges, Chris Pine, and San Antonio actor Gil Birmingham, who attended the screening. The festival awarded its 2016 Lifetime Achievement Award to Marcia Nasatir, a San Antonio native and the first woman to become Vice-President of Production at a major motion picture studio (United Artists) in 1974.

History

After his sophomore year at San Antonio College, Adam Rocha was invited to screen his short film at the San Diego Latino Film Festival in California. The experience inspired him to organize his own film festival. In 1994, the first festival screened a dozen films and awarded low-rider bikes to the best picture.

That year, Fredrick Weiss, the founder of the Texas Music Coalition, encouraged Rocha to develop the festival into a more substantial event. Renamed “The San Antonio Underground Film Festival,” the small festival expanded over the next five years into an event that attracted wider participation, larger audiences, and greater news coverage.

The non-profit's mission statement still drives the organization: “to offer an accessible and inclusive platform for artists and to provide cinematic culture to a diverse audience,” while maintaining a sociable, community-centered atmosphere. For several years, the historic Instituto Cultural de México partnered with the festival to provide a venue.

In 2006, the organization adopted its current name: SAFILM – San Antonio Film Festival.

In 2016, the festival joined forces with the Historic Pearl to offer the very first SAFILM – San Antonio Children’s Film Festival at the Pearl Studio.

Throughout the year, SAFILM volunteers encourage students to appreciate the arts and become involved in filmmaking by visiting high schools to give guest lectures. The festival itself helps students begin film careers, highlights outstanding filmmakers with a variety of awards, exposes rising talent, and reminds the public of the value of art.

Since its inception, SAFILM has also showcased local visual artists. Artists Mig Kokinda, James Cobb, Robert Tatum and Rigoberto Luna are among those who've designed festival posters. The 2009 SAFILM poster created by Rigoberto Luna was selected as a finalist for the 39th annual The Hollywood Reporter Key Art Awards for Theatrical Print - Festival Posters.

Awards
2018 SAFILM Award Winners
Short Screenplay Winner: “Forever Waiting”, by: Gavin O'Herlihy
Feature Screenplay Winner: “John Horse”, by: Walt Alexander and James Riordan
Grand Prize: “Stella’s Last Weekend”, Director: Polly Draper
Best Performance in a Leading Role: "Valentina", Victoria Del Rosal
Jury Prize for Best Narrative Short: “Unlucky’s Luck”, Director: Felipe Holguin
Jury Prize for Best Documentary Short: “Do or Die”, Director: Dan Klores
Jury Prize for best Historical Feature Documentary: “Fail State”, Directors: Alexander Shebanow
Jury Prize Best Historical Short: “Towards the Sun”, Director: Monica Santis
Jury Prize for Best Animated Short: “Weekends”, Director: Trevor Jimenez
Jury Prize Best Narrative Feature: “The Darkest Days of Us”, Director: Astrid Rondero
 Jury Prize Best College Filmmaker: “The Letter”, Director: Jazmin Aguilar
Jury Prize Best High School Filmmaker: “Catman: The Love Thief”, Director: Austin Coombs-Perez
Jury Prize Best San Antonio Filmmaker: “Tia Chuck”, Director: Angela Walley & Mark Walley
Jury Prize Best Actress in a Leading Role: “The Butterfly Tree”, Melissa George
Legacy Award: Actor and Director Jesse Borrego
Lifetime Achievement Award: Producer Fred Roos
Audience Award for Best Narrative Feature: Colossal Youth, Director: Scott Leisk
Audience Award for Best Documentary Feature: HERMANOS, Director: Laura Plancarte

2017 SAFILM Award Winners
 Grand Prize: Silverfish, Director: Matthew Thorton
 Jury Prize for Best Narrative Short: It was Nice to Meet You, Director: Kaicey Chae
 Jury Prize for Best Documentary Short: Refugee, Director: Joyce Chen & Emily Moore
 Jury Prize for Best Animated Short: Journey, Director: Radheya Jegatheva
 Jury Prize for Best College Filmmaker: Mind Your Body, Director: Silke C. Engler
 Jury Prize for Best High School Filmmaker: Three Tales of a Coin, Director Nishok Nishok
 Jury Prize for Best San Antonio Filmmaker: #prayfor, Director Dave Sims
 Jury Prize for Best Historical/Feature Documentary: Daughters of the Curved Moon, Director: Miranda Morton Yap & Sophie Dia Pegrum
 Jury Prize for Best Narrative Feature: I Am Still Here, Director: Mischa Marcus
 Best Short Screenplay: The Minutiae, by Dean Friske
 Best Feature Screenplay: The Clever Girl, by David Carren
 Lifetime Achievement Award: Harry J. Ufland

2016 SAFILM Award Winners
 Grand Prize: Mile End, Director: Graham Higgins
 Jury Prize for Best Narrative Short: Morgue, Director: Laurent Prim
 Jury Prize for Best Documentary Short: Looking for Trouble, Director: Caroline Cuny & Bryan Campbell
 Jury Prize for Best Animated Short: One Day on Carver Street, Director: Azure Allen
 Jury Prize for Best College Filmmaker: Zaar, Director: Ibrahim Nada
 Jury Prize for Best High School Filmmaker: The 1% Crisis in the Great Lakes, Director Griffin Olis
 Jury Prize for Best San Antonio Filmmaker: Birth of a Killer, Director Daniel Maldonado
 Jury Prize for Best Historical/Feature Documentary: Until 20, Director: Jamila Paksima & Geraldine Moriba
 Jury Prize for Best Narrative Feature: Second Impression, Director: Wallace Weatherspoon
 Jury Prize for Best Documentary Feature: Brewed in the 210, Director: Marco Ortega
 Jury Prize for Best Performance: Kaveh Kavian in Zaar
 Jury Prize for Best Actress in a Leading Role: Fabienne Hollwege in Morgue
 Best Short Screenplay: Before the Bomb, by Tannaz Hazemi & James Grimaldi
 Best Feature Screenplay: The Changer, by J. Motos Gordon
 Supporter of Cinema Arts Award: Guerrero CPA Principal- Mr. Ed Guerrero
 Lifetime Achievement Award: Marcia Nasatir2014 SAFILM Award Winners
 Grand Prize: 3:13, Director: David Jaure
 Jury Prize for Best Performance: Kathleen Chalfant, Isn't It Delicious Jury Prize for Narrative Short: Fade, Director: Parish Rahbar
 Jury Prize for Best Documentary Short: Kings of BBQ Barbecue Kuwait, Director: John Markus
 Jury Prize for Best Animated Short: Driven, Director: Michael Zachary Huber
 Best San Antonio Filmmaker: Fields Afire, Director: Will Underwood
 Best College Filmmaker: 113 Degrees, Director: Sabrina Doyle
 Best Independent Feature Film: The Wisdom to Know the Difference, Director: Daniel Baldwin
 Best High School Filmmaker: Creatures of the Hidden Realm, Director: Alexia Salingaros
 Best Feature Documentary: Jose Canseco: The Truth Hurts, Director: Bill McAdams
 Audience Choice Award for Best Documentary Feature: Jose Canseco: The Truth Hurts, Director: Bill McAdams
 Audience Choice Award for Best Narrative Feature: The Wisdom to Know the Difference, Director: Daniel Baldwin

2012 SAFILM Award Winners
 Audience Award for Best Documentary Feature: Along Recovery, Director Justin Springer 
 Audience Award for Best Narrative Feature: A Schizophrenic Love Story, Director Glenn Levy
 Grand Prize: Portion, Director Gisberg Bermudez, Producers Juan Villarreal, Adrian Falcon 
 Jury Prize for Best Performance: David Diaan, Mossadegh Jury Prize for Best Narrative Short: Crescendo, Directed by Alonso Alvarez
 Jury Prize for Best Documentary Short: Innocente, Producer Albie Hecht
 Jury Prize for Best Animated Short: World’s Apart, Director Michael Zachary Huber
 Jury Prize for Best College Filmmaker: Children of the Air, Director Damian Horan
 Jury Prize for Best High School Filmmaker: Cardiac Arrest, Director Maqui Gaona
 Jury Prize for Best San Antonio Filmmaker: Lilia, Director Sam Lerma

2011 SAFILM Award Winners
GRAND PRIZE: Crime After Crime, Director: Yoav Potash
Jury Prize for Best College Filmmaker: After the Shearing, Director: Vanessa Rojas
Jury Prize for Best High School Filmmaker: She is..., Director: Amber Cordova
Jury Prize for Best San Antonio Filmmaker: Katrina’s Son, Director: Ya’Ke Smith
Jury Prize for Best Narrative Short: Homecoming, Director: Lorian James Delman
Audience Award for Best Narrative Feature: Beautiful Silence, Director: Jorge A. Jimenez
Audience Award for Best Documentary Short: Operation: Hands On, Director: Gary Logan
Audience Award for Best Documentary Feature: The Harvest, Director: U. Roberto Romano
Audience Award for Best Animated Short: Martyris, Director: Luis Felipe Hernandez
Audience Award for Best Performance: Beautiful Silence, Director: Jorge A. Jimenez

2010 SAFILM Award Winners
SAFILM Grand Prize - Twenty Five Hundred & One, Dir: Patricia Van Ryker
SAFILM Jury Prize for Best Narrative Short - Efrain, Dir: Matthew Breault
SAFILM Jury Prize for Best Documentary Short - the Last Elephants in Thailand, Donald R. Tayloe & Michelle Mizner
SAFILM Jury prize for the Best Animated Short - Closed Zone, Dir: Yoni Goodman
SAFILM Jury prize for the Best San Antonio Filmmaker - the Fall Of the House Of Usher, Dir: Eric Fonseca
SAFILM Jury prize for the Best High School Filmmaker - No Pity, Dir: Drew Goldsmith
SAFILM Jury Prize for Best College Filmmaker - Mashed, Dir: Adam Fisher
SAFILM Jury Prize are for Best Performance in a Short - An Affair With Dolls, Alexandra Chalupa
SAFILM Jury Prize Best Performance in a Feature - Fanny, Annie, & Danny, Jill Pixley
SAFILM Audience Award for the Best Narrative Feature - Go For It!, Dir: Carmen Marron
SAFILM Audience Award for Best Documentary Feature - Last Survivor, Dir: Michael Pertnoy

2009 Award Winners
SAFILM Grand Prize - Funeral March for a Marionette, Dir: Eric Fonseca
SAFILM Jury Prize for Best Performance - Cruzando, Michael Ray Escamilla
SAFILM Jury Prize for Best Narrative Short - La Tangente, Dir: Vincent Vesco
SAFILM Jury Prize for Best Documentary Short - In His Blood, Dir: Vianna Davila
SAFILM Jury Prize for Best Animated Short - Funeral March for a Marionette, Dir: Eric Fonseca
SAFILM Best High School Filmmaker - La Memoria de Amor, Dir: Andie C. Flores
SAFILM Best San Antonio Filmmaker - Death Rattle, Dir: A. J. Garces
SAFILM Audience Award for Best Narrative Feature - Doctor "S" Battles the Sex Crazed Reefer Zombies, Dir: Bryan Ortiz
Audience Award for Best Documentary Feature - Beyond the Call, Dir: Adrian Belic

2008 Award Winners
SAFILM Grand Prize - Adventures of Power, Dir: Ari Gold
SAFILM Auteur Award - Crawford, Dir: David Modigliani
SAFILM Auteur Award - Reborn: New Orleans Schools, Dir: Drea Cooper

2007 Award Winners
SAFILM Grand Prize – Get Thrashed: The Story of Thrash Metal, Dir: Rick Ernst
SAFILM Indie Auteur Awards – Zombie Love, Dir: Yfke van Berckelaer
SAFILM Indie Max – Tijuana Makes Me Happy'', Dir: Dylan Verrechia

Website
San Antonio Film Festival website

References

Film festivals in Texas
Festivals in San Antonio